Beta-ketodecanoyl-(acyl-carrier-protein) synthase is an enzyme with systematic name octanoyl-CoA:malonyl-(acyl-carrier protein) C-heptanoylltransferase (decarboxylating, CoA-forming). This enzyme catalyses the following chemical reaction

 octanoyl-CoA + malonyl-[acyl-carrier protein]  3-oxodecanoyl-[acyl-carrier protein] + CoA + CO2

This enzyme is purified from the bacterium Pseudomonas aeruginosa PAO1.

References

External links 
 

EC 2.3.1